Dmytro Hrytsai (a.k.a. "Perebyinis"; Ukrainian: Дмитрó Грицáй-Переб́ийніс; Dorozhiv, Galicia, 1 April 1907 – 22 December 1945, Prague, Czechoslovakia) was a leader in the Organization of Ukrainian Nationalists and a general in the Ukrainian Insurgent Army.

Life
Born in Galicia, Hrytsai graduated from gymnasium in Drohobych (then part of eastern Poland) and became a member of the Ukrainian Military Organization (UVO). In 1928 he matriculated in the Lviv University Department of Physics and Mathematics. He did not graduate, being called to military service in the Polish Army. He completed officers' school with distinction.

In this period of his life he joined the Organization of Ukrainian Nationalists (OUN). From 1933 he directed the OUN Executive's military department. In 1934 he was arrested by the Polish police and was held for over two years at Bereza Kartuska Prison.

After his release, he resumed his studies at Lwów University.

In 1939 he was again incarcerated at Bereza Kartuska, but was released after Poland had been overrun by Germany and the Soviet Union.

In 1940–41 Hrytsai was a member of the OUN Revolutionary Directorate and took part in the second Great OUN Congress. In 1941–43 he actively participated in partisan operations against  Nazi German forces. From 1941 he headed the OUN's Military Staff, working to discover the German command's tactical plans, creating weapons and supply depots, and training officer cadres for a Ukrainian army.  
  
In 1943 Hrytsai was arrested by the German Gestapo, but was freed by a Ukrainian Insurgent Army (UPA) attack on the prison. He directed UPA'''s General Staff.  In 1945 he became UPA Chief of Staff and received the rank of general.

In 1945 together with OUN Directorate member Taras Maivski, while carrying out assignments for the Ukrainian Chief Council of Liberation, he fell into a Czech police trap while crossing the Czech-German border.  After being tortured, he was executed at the Prague prison.

See also
Ukrainian Insurgent Army

References
 Sergei Chuyev, Ukrainskyi Legion'', Moscow, 2006. (In Russian.)

External links
Biography on Ukrainian military portal

1907 births
1945 deaths
People from Lviv Oblast
Ukrainian Austro-Hungarians
People from the Kingdom of Galicia and Lodomeria
Organization of Ukrainian Nationalists
Commanders of the Ukrainian Insurgent Army
Ukrainian revolutionaries
Ukrainian people executed abroad
Ukrainian people imprisoned abroad
Inmates of Bereza Kartuska Prison
Ukrainian torture victims
People executed by the Third Republic of Czechoslovakia
Polish soldiers